Dalva e Herivelto: uma Canção de Amor (English: Songs of Betrayal) is a 2010 Brazilian miniseries created by Maria Adelaide Amaral and directed by Dennis Carvalho. It was produced and aired by Rede Globo.

The series stars Adriana Esteves and Fábio Assunção in the roles of Dalva de Oliveira and Herivelto Martins respectively. Songs of Betrayal received two nominations for the 39th International Emmy Awards.

Plot 
Protagonists of an intense and passionate relationship, Dalva and Herivelto live the duality of a perfect match on their artistic life and a complete misadventure in their personal lives. While, professionally, Herivelto is a dedicated and concerned partner, in their private life he drives Dalva crazy, causing her to drink away her jealousy.
 
Their routine of fights and reconciliations becomes even more complicated when Herivelto falls in love with Lourdes, who he intends to marry. However, to accomplish this union, besides leaving Dalva, he must give up the musical partnership that has brought them great success.

Cast

Repercussion

Ratings point 

 His overall average was 29.4 points. Sum of ratings of all chapters divided by the total number of chapters (five).

Awards 
2011 International Emmy Awards 
 Best Actress for Adriana Esteves (Nom)
 Best Actor for Fábio Assunção (Nom)

References

External links 
 Official Website

Rede Globo original programming
Brazilian television series
Brazilian drama television series
Brazilian television miniseries
2010 Brazilian television series endings
Television series based on singers and musicians